ABV may also refer to:
 ABV (TV station), the Australian Broadcasting Corporation's Melbourne TV station
 Alcohol by volume,  a measure of the alcohol content of alcoholic drinks.
 Appendix Barberino-Vaticana, one of the syllogae minores of the Greek Anthology
 Assault Breacher Vehicle, a military vehicle
 Atal Bihari Vajpayee (1924–2018), former Prime Minister of India
 Avian bornavirus, a virus
 Bahrani Arabic, a variety of Arabic spoken in Bahrain
 Nnamdi Azikiwe International Airport, Abuja, Nigeria, from its IATA airport code
 Alternative for Bulgarian Revival (Алтернатива за българско възраждане, АБВ/ABV), political party in Bulgaria
 АБВ, the first three letters of the Cyrillic script, analogous to ABC
 Attic Black-figure Vase-Painters, a reference book by John Beazley